Blood Lad is a 2013 Japanese anime series based on the manga written and illustrated by Yuuki Kodama. In another dimension, otaku vampire, Staz Charlie Blood and his gang stumble upon Fuyumi Yanagi—a high school girl who somehow finds her way into their dimension from the human world. Fuyumi's presence induces a vampiric infatuation from Staz, but his time with her is cut short after she is killed by a rogue carnivorous demon plant and turns into a ghost, leaving Staz determined to resurrect her as a living human.

The anime is produced by Brain's Base and directed by Shigeyuki Miya, with script writing by Takeshi Konuta and character designs by Kenji Fujisaki. The series premiered on tvk on July 7, 2013 with later airings on Tokyo MX, Sun TV and BS11. The series ran for ten episodes, ending on September 8, 2013 and was followed by an original video animation on December 1, 2013. Kadokawa Shoten released the series in Japan on 5 Blu-ray and DVD volumes between September 27, 2013 and January 31, 2014. The series was licensed by Viz Media in North America and was streamed with English subtitles on Viz Anime and in an English dub on Neon Alley. Anime Limited also licensed the series for a home media release in the United Kingdom. Hanabee Entertainment later obtained the series for release in Australia and New Zealand.

The opening theme is "ViViD" by May'n while the ending theme is "Bloody Holic" by Yuuka Nanri.



Episode list

Home media
Kadokawa Shoten released the series in Japan on five Blu-ray and DVD volumes between September 27, 2013 and January 31, 2014. Original manga creator, Yuuki Kodama drew the box artwork of each volume. The complete series was released by Viz Media in North America on Blu-ray and DVD format on September 2, 2014. This was followed by releases by Hanabee Entertainment on January 7, 2015. and by Anime Limited on January 26, 2015. These releases contained English and Japanese audio options and English subtitles.

Notes

References

External links
Official anime website 

Blood Lad